Eric Van Den Brink is a Dutch musician and record producer. He has released albums of his own work and is producer of a wide variety of collaborations under the pseudonym (and anagram) of Nick Vernier Band. Featured collaborators include Blondie Chaplin, Probyn Gregory, Gerry Beckley (with Jeffrey Foskett), Paul Jones, David Paton, David Bullock, Matt Malley, Iain Matthews, Emitt Rhodes, Duncan Maitland, Pizza Delivery Boys, Shandon Sahm, Janaki, and Iason Chronis, among others. Van Den Brink is also producer of Nick Vernier Band-mixes for Yoko Ono Plastic Ono Band.

Previous associations include activities as A&R-man and recording engineer for recordings with Jan Akkerman, Rob Bolland, David Vermeulen, Colin Blunstone, Ian Gillan, and Herman Brood with Dick Dale, Hans Dulfer, Candy Dulfer, Jules Deelder, Nina Hagen, and Trijntje Oosterhuis. More current related productions include Style Detectives, the first new Monkees-related release in over a decade (produced under license from Rhino Entertainment, featuring vocal samples from the band, Willem De Ridder, and Cosmo Police (with Atsuko Kurokawa). As an actor, Van Den Brink appeared in various TV series on Dutch television (ONM, GTST, Blauw Blauw, and Graffiti).

Discography
(selection)
 Herman Brood 50 The Soundtrack (album) (1996)
 Dick Dale with Herman Brood Jungle (single) (1996)
 Herman Brood feat. Hans Dulfer & Candy Dulfer Wild Sugar (single) (1996)
 Herman Brood feat. Trijntje Oosterhuis Fire And Rain (single) (1996)
 Nina Hagen & Herman Brood Gimme Your Love (single) (1996)
 Style Detectives Incidentals (album) (1997)
 Style Detectives French Waltz (single) (1997)
 David Vermeulen David Vermeulen (album) (1998)
 Jan Akkerman Just Stanley (album) (1998)
 Willem De Ridder Spiegelogie Rap (album) (2000)
 Eddie Conard Jasmine Breeze (single) (2000)
 E-Dude feat. Esmée What You Do (single) (2007)
 Iain Matthews Woodstock (Nick Vernier Band Mix) (single) (2009)
 Cosmo Police One World (single, Japan) (2009)
 Nick Vernier Band Addendum (EP) (2009)
 Nick Vernier Band with Paul Jones I'm Your Kingpin (single) (2009)
 Nick Vernier Band Sessions (2010)
 Yoko Ono Plastic Ono Band The Sun Is Down! (Nick Vernier Band Mix) (single) (2010)
 Nick Vernier Band feat. The Monkees Mister Bob (single) (2011)
 Janaki (with Iason Chronis, Matt Malley & Nick Vernier Band) Agaraga (single) (2011)
 P’etra & Mp3trio A Winter’s Tale (single) (2011)
 Probyn Gregory & Nick Vernier Band I Send Up My Prayer (single) (2012)
 Gerry Beckley & Nick Vernier Band (with Jeffrey Foskett) Now Sue (single) (2012)
 David Paton Don't Know What To Say (single) (2013)
 Musicboat Shell Dance (single) (2013)
 Nikki Genee Ik Ook Van Jou (single) (2013)
 Nick Vernier Band Hope (single) (2014)
 Renske Taminiau Safe Journey (single) (2014)
 Nick Vernier Band You Didn’t Have To Be So Nice (single) (2014)
 Tim Treffers Love Is The Ruler (single) (2014)
 Tim Treffers Real Good Love (single) (2015)
 Musicboat Ahoy (album) (2015)
 Douw Fonda Cello (EP) (2015)
 Fay Lovsky And The Water Came (EP) (2015)
 Jeroen Van Der Wel Piccolo Concerto (EP) (2015)
 Renske Taminiau Paris (EP) (2015)
 Saejeong Kim Nulla In Mundo Pax (album) (2015)
 Pizza Delivery Boys On 42nd Street (single) (2015)
 Pizza Delivery Boys Spooky (single) (2015)
 Nick Vernier Band Autumn Mist (single) (2015)
 Laura Van Eeden Working Class Hero (single) (2015)
 Platvorm Anton (single) (2016)
 Tim Treffers Never Trust A Man In A Fur Coat (album, Japan) (2016)
 Tim Treffers Hold Me Back (bonus track, Japan) (2016)
 Jera Ivory Don’t Give Up On Me (single) (2016)
 Tim Treffers Carnival Of Life (album, Japan) (2017)
 Tim Treffers Hold On (single) (2017)
 David Bullock Summers (single) (2017)
 Jera Ivory I Can't Stand The Rain (single) (2017)
 Scott Brookman with Nick Vernier Band Sitting In A House (single) (2018)
 David Bullock I'll Be With You (single) (2018)
 Jera Ivory All Night Long (single) (2019)
 Shandon Sahm feat. Eric Van Den Brink She's About A Mover (album track) (2020)
 David Paton 2020 (album) (2020)

References

External links
Paul Jones
Matt Malley
David Paton
Iain Matthews
Gerry Beckley
Probyn Gregory
Nick Vernier Band
Stephen John Kalinich
Yoko Ono Plastic Ono Band

Dutch record producers
Remixers
Living people
Year of birth missing (living people)